Live! is a live album by The Charlie Daniels Band released on October 9, 2001. All of the tracks except for the last track, "This Ain't No Rag, It's a Flag" are live recordings.

Track listing 
 "Introduction" - 0:22
 "Road Dogs" - 3:53
 "Caballo Diablo" - 4:45
 "The Legend of Wooley Swamp" - 4:41
 "Simple Man" - 3:18
 "Sidewinder" - 7:37
 "Trudy" - 4:54
 "Still in Saigon" - 4:48
 "In America" - 3:25
 "Take the Highway" - 4:47
 "Elizabeth Reed" - 5:14
 "Free Bird" - 7:07
 "The South's Gonna Do It" - 4:41
 "Long Haired Country Boy" - 4:07
 "Drinkin' My Baby Goodbye" - 4:01
 "The Devil Went Down to Georgia" - 5:22
 "This Ain't No Rag, It's a Flag" [Bonus Track] - 3:28

Chart performance

Album

Singles

Personnel
The Charlie Daniels Band:
Charlie Daniels - Guitar, fiddle, vocals
Bruce Ray Brown - Guitar, vocals
Chris Wormer - Guitar, vocals
Mark Matejka - Guitar, vocals
Joel "Taz" DiGregorio - keyboards, vocals
Julian King - trumpet
Pat McDonald - drums, percussion
Charles Hayward - Bass

References

Charlie Daniels albums
2001 live albums
E1 Music live albums